The  was a school established to train line officers for the Imperial Japanese Navy. It was originally located in Nagasaki, moved to Yokohama in 1866, and was relocated to Tsukiji, Tokyo in 1869. It moved to Etajima, Hiroshima in 1888. Students studied for three or four years, and upon graduation were ordered (warranted) as Midshipmen, commissioned to the rank of Ensign/Acting Sub-Lieutenant after a period of active duty and an overseas cruise. In 1943, a separate school for naval aviation was opened in Iwakuni, and in 1944, another naval aviation school was established in Maizuru. The Academy was closed in 1945, when the Imperial Japanese Navy was abolished. The Naval Academy Etajima opened in 1956 and the site now serves as the location for Officer Candidate School of the Japan Maritime Self-Defense Force.

See also
Imperial Japanese Army Academy
Army War College
Imperial Japanese Army Air Force Academy
Imperial Japanese Navy
Imperial Japanese Naval Engineering College
Naval War College
Recruitment in the Imperial Japanese Navy
List of graduates of the Japanese Imperial Military Academies
Naval Academy Etajima
Gosei (meditation) - Academy's motto in most of the classes
Pilot training in the Imperial Japanese Navy

External sources
 

Educational institutions established in 1866
Educational institutions disestablished in 1945
Imperial Japanese Navy
Naval academies
Naval history of Japan
Defunct Japanese military academies
1866 establishments in Japan